A leakage occurs when fluid is lost through a leak.

Leakage may also refer to:

 Leakage (chemistry), a process in which material is lost through holes or defects in containers
 Leakage (economics)
 Carbon leakage or emissions leakage, whereby another country increases its greenhouse gas emissions in response to a unilateral climate policy
 Leakage (electronics)
Crosstalk (electronics), also known as Leakage, where signals are picked up by an unintended device
 Spill (audio), where audio from one source is picked up by a microphone intended for a different source
 Leakage (machine learning)
 Leakage (semiconductors)
 Leakage (retail)
 Leakage effect, the loss of tourist revenue from a country
 Memory leak, in computer science
 Spectral leakage, in signal processing

Similar uses
 Fecal incontinence
 Urinary incontinence

See also
 Leak (disambiguation)

ja:リーク電流